Blanshard Peak also known as The Blanshard Needle by local climbers is a distinctive rock pinnacle in Golden Ears Provincial Park that is visible from many places in the Lower Mainland. Named for the first governor of the colony of Vancouver Island, the name of the summit and area is the subject of some confusion due to the labeling of the entire Golden Ears Group on the published maps for the area. Mount Blanshard is the proper name of the Golden Ears massif, and later became attached by authors of climbing guides to the summit at the southern end of the group.

See also
 Golden Ears Group
 Golden Ears (mountain)
 Edge Peak
 Golden Ears Provincial Park

Notes

References

External links

Mountains of the Lower Mainland
Maple Ridge, British Columbia
Garibaldi Ranges
One-thousanders of British Columbia
New Westminster Land District